Javier Arenas may refer to:

 Javier Arenas (American football) (born 1987), American football player
 Javier Arenas (Spanish politician) (born 1957), spokesman for Parliament of Andalusia and senator for Andalusia